Jay Andrijic and Bradley Mousley were the defending champions, but Andrijic was no longer eligible to participate. 
Mousley successfully defended the title with Lucas Miedler, defeating Quentin Halys and Johan-Sébastien Tatlot in the final, 6–4, 6–3.

Seeds

Draw

Finals

Top half

Bottom half

References

External links 

 ITF Tennis

Boys' Doubles
2014